Hugh Massy, 1st Baron Massy (1700 – 30 January 1788) was an Anglo-Irish peer and politician.

Massy was the son of Colonel Hugh Massy and the elder brother of General Eyre Massey, 1st Baron Clarina. He married firstly Mary Dawson, daughter of Colonel James Dawson by who he had four children. He married secondly Rebecca Delap, daughter of Francis Delap of Antigua, and had a further seven children.

He was appointed High Sheriff of County Limerick for 1739 and was a Member of the Irish House of Commons for Limerick County between 1759 and 1776. Subsequently, he represented Old Leighlin until 1777.

In 1776 he was raised to the Peerage of Ireland as Baron Massy, of Duntrileague in the County of Limerick. Lord Massy died in January 1788 and was succeeded in the barony by his son Hugh.

References

Kidd, Charles, Williamson, David (editors). Debrett's Peerage and Baronetage (1990 edition). New York: St Martin's Press, 1990.

1700 births
1788 deaths
Barons in the Peerage of Ireland
Peers of Ireland created by George III
Irish MPs 1727–1760
Irish MPs 1761–1768
Irish MPs 1769–1776
Irish MPs 1776–1783
High Sheriffs of County Limerick
18th-century Anglo-Irish people
Members of the Irish House of Lords
Members of the Parliament of Ireland (pre-1801) for County Limerick constituencies
Members of the Parliament of Ireland (pre-1801) for County Carlow constituencies